Asura trifasciata is a moth of the family Erebidae. It is found in Sulawesi.

References

trifasciata
Moths described in 1946
Moths of Indonesia